is a Japanese synchronized swimmer.

She took up the sport at the age of seven, and made her international debut in 2009 at the World Championships in Rome.

She retired in September 2017.

References

1989 births
Living people
Japanese synchronized swimmers
Olympic synchronized swimmers of Japan
Synchronized swimmers at the 2012 Summer Olympics
Asian Games medalists in artistic swimming
Artistic swimmers at the 2010 Asian Games
Artistic swimmers at the 2014 Asian Games
World Aquatics Championships medalists in synchronised swimming
Synchronized swimmers at the 2009 World Aquatics Championships
Synchronized swimmers at the 2011 World Aquatics Championships
Synchronized swimmers at the 2013 World Aquatics Championships
Synchronized swimmers at the 2015 World Aquatics Championships
Synchronized swimmers at the 2016 Summer Olympics
Olympic bronze medalists for Japan
Olympic medalists in synchronized swimming
Medalists at the 2016 Summer Olympics
Asian Games silver medalists for Japan
Medalists at the 2010 Asian Games
Medalists at the 2014 Asian Games
Synchronized swimmers at the 2017 World Aquatics Championships
Sportspeople from Kobe
21st-century Japanese women